RPM ( and later ) was a Canadian music-industry publication that featured song and album charts for Canada. The publication was founded by Walt Grealis in February 1964, supported through its existence by record label owner Stan Klees. RPM ceased publication in November 2000.

RPM stood for "Records, Promotion, Music". The magazine's title varied over the years, including RPM Weekly and RPM Magazine.

Canadian music charts
RPM maintained several format charts, including Top Singles (all genres), Adult Contemporary, Dance, Urban, Rock/Alternative and Country Tracks (or Top Country Tracks) for country music. On 21 March 1966, RPM expanded its Top Singles chart from 40 positions to 100. On 6 December 1980, the main chart became a top-50 chart and remained this way until 4 August 1984, whereupon it reverted to a top-100 singles chart.

For the first several weeks of its existence, the magazine did not compile a national chart, but simply printed the current airplay lists of several major-market top-40 stations. A national chart was introduced in the 22 June 1964 issue, and the first national number-one single was "Chapel of Love" by the Dixie Cups. Prior to the introduction of RPM's national chart, the CHUM Chart issued by Toronto radio station CHUM was considered the de facto national chart. The final number-one single in the magazine's chart was "Music" by Madonna.

The RPM Awards
The modern Juno Awards had their origins in an annual survey conducted by RPM since its founding year. Readers of the magazine were invited to mail in survey ballots to indicate their choices under various categories of people or companies.

The RPM Awards poll was transformed into a formal awards ceremony, the Gold Leaf Awards, in 1970. These became the Juno Awards in following years.

1964 RPM Awards
The RPM Awards for 1964 were announced in the 28 December 1964 issue:

 Top male vocalist: Terry Black
 Top female singer: Shirley Matthews
 Most promising male vocalist: Jack London
 Most promising female vocalist: Linda Layne
 Top vocal instrumental group: The Esquires
 Top female vocal group: The Girlfriends
 Top instrumental group: Wes Dakus & The Rebels
 Top folk group: The Courriers
 Top country male singer: Gary Buck
 Top country female singer: Pat Hervey
 Industry man of the year: Johnny Murphy of Cashbox Canada
 Top record company: Capitol Records of Canada
 Top Canadian Content record company: Capitol Records of Canada
 Top national record promoter: Paul White, Capitol Records of Canada
 Top regional record promoter: Ed Lawson, Quality Records
 Top album of the year (GMP): That Girl by Phyllis Marshall

A column on page 6 of that issue noted that the actual vote winner for Top Canadian Content record company was disqualified due to a conflict of interest involving an employee of that company who was also working for RPM. Therefore, runner-up Capitol Records was declared the category's winner.

1965 RPM Awards

The Annual RPM Awards for 1965 were announced in the 17 January 1966 issue, with more country music categories than the previous year:

 Top male vocalist: Bobby Curtola
 Top female singer: Catherine McKinnon
 Most promising male vocalist: Barry Allen
 Most promising female vocalist: Debbie Lori Kaye
 Top vocal/instrumental group: The Guess Who
 Top female vocal group: Girlfriends
 Top instrumental group: Wes Dakus and the Rebels
 Top folk group: Malka and Joso
 Top folk singer: Gordon Lightfoot
 Best produced single: "My Girl Sloopy", Little Caesar and the Consuls
 Best produced album: Voice of an Angel by Catherine McKinnon
 Top country male singer: Gary Buck
 Top country female singer: Dianne Leigh
 Most promising country male singer: Angus Walker
 Most promising country female singer: Sharon Strong
 Top country instrumental vocal group: Rhythm Pals
 Top country instrumentalist: Roy Penney
 Top country radio personality: Al Fisher, CFGM Toronto
 Top Canadian disc jockey: Chuck Benson, CKYL Peace River
 Top record company: Capitol Records of Canada
 Top Canadian Content record company: Capitol Records of Canada
 Top national record promoter: Paul White, Capitol Records of Canada
 Top regional record promoter: Charlie Camilleri, Quality Records

1966 RPM Awards
The winners were:
 Top male vocalist: Barry Allen
 Top female singer: Catherine McKinnon
 Most promising male vocalist: Jimmy Dybold
 Most promising female vocalist: Lynda Lane 
 Top vocal/instrumental group: Staccatos
 Top female vocal group: Allan Sisters
 Top folk group: 3's a Crowd
 Top folk singer: Gordon Lightfoot
 Best produced single: "Let's Run Away", Staccatos
 Top country male singer: Gary Buck
 Top country female singer: Dianne Leigh
 Most promising country male singer: Johnny Burke
 Most promising country female singer: Debbie Lori Kaye 
 Top country instrumental vocal group: Mercey Brothers
 Top country instrumentalist: Roy Penney
 Top country radio personality: Ted Daigle
 Top country radio station: CFGM
 Top record company: Capitol Records of Canada
 Top Canadian Content record company: Red Leaf Records
 Top national record promoter: Paul White, Capitol Records of Canada
 Top regional record promoter: Al Nair 
 Top Canadian music industry man of the year: Stan Klees

See also 

 List of number-one singles in Canada
 List of RPM number-one alternative rock singles
 List of RPM number-one country singles
 List of RPM number-one dance singles

References

External links
 Browse RPM issues 1964-2000
 RPM archive charts
 RPM (historical information)
 Library and Archives Canada: "The RPM Story"
 The Canadian Encyclopedia: RPM

Magazines established in 1964
Magazines disestablished in 2000
Music magazines published in Canada
Canadian record charts
Defunct magazines published in Canada
Magazines published in Toronto
1964 establishments in Ontario
2000 disestablishments in Ontario
Weekly magazines published in Canada
Canadian music history
20th century in Ontario